Professor Elchanan Israel Meir (10 July 1936 – 17 February 2014; Hebrew: אלחנן ישראל מאיר) was an Israeli psychologist who was a professor in the Department of Psychological at the Tel Aviv University. He was the president of the Israeli Psychology Association for 10 years and chairman of the Council of  Psychology in Israel for 6 years.

Biography 
Elhanan I. Meir was born on 1936 in Jerusalem. After his army service in the IDF he studied at the Hebrew University of Jerusalem (B.A. in Psychology, Statistics, Sociology; M.A. in Psychology). He received his Ph.D. at the University of Amsterdam, Netherlands (1968).

Meir's specialty was Vocational and Counseling Psychology. Most of his articles were published in the Journal of Vocational Behavior and in the Journal of Career Assessment. Meir also was the head of the research unit of the Hadassah Vocational Counseling Institute.

After 39 years at the Tel Aviv University, Meir retired as a full professor.

In 2002, at the age of 66, Meir started to study at the Yeshivat Otniel.

On February 17, 2014, Meir died after a long battle with cancer.

Publications 
Among Meir's publications and the books "Statistics for the Behavioral Sciences" (16 editions, in Hebrew),"Shabath Vayinafash" (five books on the Torah, in Hebrew), and "Minor Personalities in the book of Bereshit: Psychological insights".

In 2007, The Journal of Vocational Behavior ranked Meir as first among authors of articles during the previous 34 years.

References

External links 
 Professor Elchanan Israel Meir, What is the Tzaraath?, Yeshivat Otniel website
 Professor Elchanan Israel Meir, Parashas Chayei Sarah - At a psychological, Yeshivat Otniel website

1936 births
2014 deaths
Israeli psychologists
Academic staff of Tel Aviv University
Hebrew University of Jerusalem alumni
University of Amsterdam alumni
Israeli Jews
Zionists
People from Jerusalem